Sarah Reng Ochekpe is a Nigerian Politician from Plateau State. She was the Minister of Water Resources from 2011 to 2015.

Early life and education 
Ochekpe was born on October 4, 1961, to the family of Ali Reng Madugben in Foron, a district of Barikin Ladi Local government area of Plateau State. She had her first degree in political science from Ahmadu Bello University, then a master's degree in public administration from University of Jos. She also has post graduate qualifications from Aberdeen College of Commerce and Nigerian Institute of Journalism.

Personal life 
She is married to Professor Nelson Ochekpe from Otukpo Local Government in Benue State. He is a professor of pharmaceutical chemistry and deputy vice chancellor at the University of Jos.

Political career 
Ochekpe occupied several directorial roles in National Orientation Agency (Nigeria), before her ministerial appointment. During her time in government, she is noted to have increased the level of accessible water for Nigerians to 70%, and created and rehabilitated artificial waterways that reduced flooding and alleviated unemployment. In 2017, she and two other persons were accused of money laundering and conspiracy worth ₦450 million.

References 

1961 births
Living people
Ahmadu Bello University alumni
Nigerian women in politics
People from Plateau State
Federal ministers of Nigeria
Peoples Democratic Party (Nigeria) politicians